Kjell Lauri (born 29 June 1956) is a Swedish orienteering competitor. He was a Relay World Champion in 1979, as a member of the Swedish winning team. He also obtained silver medals in 1978 and 1985, and a bronze medal in 1983.

References

1959 births
Living people
Swedish orienteers
Male orienteers
Foot orienteers
World Orienteering Championships medalists